Winfried Hassemer (17 February 1940 – 9 January 2014) was a German criminal law scholar. He was vice president of the Federal Constitutional Court.

Born in Gau-Algesheim, Hassemer was from 1964 to 1969 a scientific assistant at the Institut for laws and social philosophy of the university of Saarland.
His widow Kristiane Weber Hassemer was a judge and state secretary to Rupert von Plottnitz. His brother Volker Hassemer was a senator in Berlin.

References 

20th-century German judges
1940 births
Justices of the Federal Constitutional Court
2014 deaths
Grand Crosses with Star and Sash of the Order of Merit of the Federal Republic of Germany
21st-century German judges